Martin Joel Greif (February 4, 1938, The Bronx, New York City - November 17, 1996, Cork, Ireland) was an American editor, lecturer, publisher and writer.  He was the uncle of heavy metal music personality and lawyer Eric Greif.

Background 
Son of an immigrant Harlem grocery store owner, Martin Greif graduated from Stuyvesant High School and was further educated at Hunter College, NYC, graduating in 1959 (B.A. cum laude) and Princeton University, graduating in 1961 (M.A. with honours), where he was a Woodrow Wilson Fellow and groomed as an expert in Daniel Defoe. After graduation he became a professor of English and taught in NY universities from 1963 to 1973, including lecturing in biblical literature at New York University, before entering the world of publishing as managing editor of Time-Life Books (1969–73), and then as co-founder and editorial director of Main Street Press. Main Street Press was founded in 1978 by Greif and his life partner, Lawrence Grow, in Clinton, New Jersey. Their first office was on Main Street in Clinton, hence the name. Both men had enjoyed successful publishing careers in Manhattan but wanted to move to the country for the wide, open spaces and the lower costs. Subsequently, the business moved to nearby Pittstown, New Jersey. Main Street specialized in publishing books on Americana, crafts and restoration. However, their biggest publishing success was the Vogue magazine spoof Dogue (1986), featuring modeling canines and billed as "a parody of the world's most famous fashion magazine".

American career 

Martin Greif became a prolific and varied author and book editor. His more than a dozen books range from Depression Modern: The Thirties Style in America (1975), a photo study of 1930s American design, predominantly architecture, that sought to define a wider, more American definition of Art Deco; Aunt Sammy's Radio Recipes (1975); The New Industrial Landscape: The Story of the Austin Company (1978); The Morning Stars Sang: The Bible in Folk Art (1978); The Airport Book: From Landing Field to Modern Terminal (1979); The Lighting Book: A Buyer's Guide to Locating Almost Every Kind of Lighting Device (1986); and The World of Tomorrow: The 1939 New York World's Fair (1988). The book for which he is best remembered, however, is The Gay Book of Days (1982) - "An evocatively illustrated who's who of who is, was, may have been, probably was, and almost certainly seems to have been gay during the past 5,000 years."

The Gay Book of Days was a gossipy, witty and lighthearted attempt to catalogue as many famous, and not so famous, gay men and lesbians as possible throughout history, ranging from Roman emperors, European kings and queens, famous writers and literary figures to the stars of Hollywood and television. For all its supposed frivolity, it was an important work at a time when the gay community was growing in confidence and visibility and was about to be struck unawares by the AIDS epidemic. Tellingly for the time, the book ends with a list headed "I Know They Are, You Know They Are, and They Know They Are, but Initials Will Just Have to Do", betraying the reality of the closet in those less open times.

Greif and Grow also wrote a few books using different, sometimes female, nom de plumes - Jean Bach, Frederick S. Copely, Martin Lawrence and Leona Wesley Hunter.

Irish years 

Greif was often asked to write an updated version of the Book of Days, to which he gave considerable thought during the 1990s, but he never got beyond the planning stages.

Martin Greif and Larry Grow spent their latter years in Ballinadee, County Cork, Ireland, where they set up Orchard Hill Press in a deal with Sterling Publishing of NYC. Greif's last works were several books on chess and puzzles, and Irish-themed titles written as Mairtin O'Griofa.

Grow died of a stroke associated with AIDS in 1991. Greif died of an AIDS-related illness in November 1996 at Cork University Hospital.

Greif's nephew is Eric Greif, a lawyer and entertainment personality known first for a management career within the heavy metal musical genre in the 1980s and later within the legal profession.

References 

1938 births
1996 deaths
American information and reference writers
American publishers (people)
American social sciences writers
Irish writers
People from the Bronx
Stuyvesant High School alumni
Princeton University alumni
Hunter College alumni
New York University faculty
20th-century American non-fiction writers
20th-century American businesspeople
AIDS-related deaths in the Republic of Ireland
American gay writers
LGBT people from New York (state)
American expatriates in Ireland
20th-century American LGBT people